Horse Creek is an unincorporated community in western Laramie County, Wyoming, United States.  It lies between Horse Creek to the north, and the South Fork of Horse Creek to the south, along WYO 211 northwest of the city of Cheyenne, the county seat of Laramie County.  Its elevation is 6,506 feet (1,983 m).  Although Horse Creek is unincorporated, it does not have a post office, but it does have a ZIP code of 82061.  As of the 2010 census, Horse Creek had an estimated population of 39.

Public education in the community of Horse Creek is provided by Laramie County School District #1.

Highways
 - north–south route through Horse Creek,
 running to Cheyenne to the southeast, and Chugwater to the northeast.
 County Road #228 (Fisher Canyon Rd.), which becomes County Road #17 (Roger Canyon Rd.), runs west from Horse Creek to Laramie.

References

Unincorporated communities in Laramie County, Wyoming
Unincorporated communities in Wyoming